The gender empathy gap is the claim that people are likely to feel more empathy for one gender than another gender in a similar situation. Many studies show that females have an on average advantage in tests of empathy.

Empathy in different genders 
According to some studies, females can recognize facial expressions and emotions more accurately and faster than males, especially some neutral body language. Additionally, females can recognize males' angry emotions better than males; males can recognize females' happy emotions better than females. However, some research shows that there is no difference between males and females on empathy. Researchers explain that females' performance of recognizing emotion is driven by motivation. In other words, if females feel the work requires them to perform higher score empathy, they would perform better, or they will perform no differently than males.

From birth, female and male neonates react to emotional stimulations differently. Experiments found that female neonates are more likely to cry when they heard others crying. Besides, they also have more eye contact with people than male neonates. Scientists believe that those reactions of female neonates may give them more chances to feel others feeling, which may amount over the years to a sufficient difference that can explain some of the empathy scores gap of males and females.

Gender empathy gap and sexism

Sexism against females 
According to the research, both males and females have a better attitude toward females than males and provide female positive traits, which is called the "women are wonderful" effect.

Sexism against males 
Studies suggest that people are more likely to put females in the position of being protected, and males as the protectors, which could be interpreted that males' mental health is not taken as seriously as females' mental health.

References

See also 
 Gender and emotional expression
 Sex differences in emotion intelligence

Empathy
Gender-related stereotypes
Gender equality
Gender roles
Sexism